The Toledo Metropolitan Area, or Greater Toledo, or Northwest Ohio is a metropolitan area centered on the American city of Toledo, Ohio. As of the 2020 census, the four-county Metropolitan Statistical Area (MSA) had a population of 646,604. It is the sixth-largest metropolitan area in the state of Ohio, behind Cincinnati–Northern Kentucky, Cleveland, Columbus, Dayton, and Akron.

Located on the border with Michigan, the metropolitan area includes the counties of Fulton, Lucas, Ottawa, and Wood. Toledo is also part of the Great Lakes Megalopolis.

The separate micropolitan areas of Findlay, Fremont, and Tiffin are included in the Toledo-Findlay-Tiffin Combined Statistical Area (CSA), which includes the counties of the Toledo MSA as well as Hancock County, Sandusky County, and Seneca County. The 2020 Census lists the population of the CSA at 835,489. 

The wider region of Northwest Ohio adds Defiance, Henry, Paulding, Putnam, Van Wert, and Williams counties.

Regional education

There are several institutions of higher education that operate campuses in the area. Some of the larger schools include The University of Toledo, Mercy College of Ohio, and Davis College in Toledo. Lourdes University in Sylvania, Stautzenberger College in Maumee, Owens Community College in Perrysburg Township, and Bowling Green State University in Bowling Green.

Regional economy

According to a 2015 article, there were three Toledo companies that made the Fortune 500 list. #399 is Owens-Illinois (O-I), which specializes in glass and glass packaging. #410 was Dana Corporation which is a global leader in the supply of thermal-management technologies among many other specialties. Lastly, at #498, Owens Corning is the world leading provider of glass fiber technology. Just outside of the Toledo metropolitan in neighboring Findlay, Ohio, #25 Marathon Petroleum Corporation is headquartered. There has been a recent revitalization of Downtown Toledo and the Warehouse District, bringing in many new restaurants and bars to the area.

The economy of Toledo has been heavily influenced by both the economy of nearby Detroit and agriculture. Recently, health care and technology firms have tried to make their way into the metropolitan, though growth in those sectors has been slow. Instead, Toledo and its suburbs are still home to several manufacturing and construction businesses and factories. The Bureau of Labor Statistics reported, in 2015, that manufacturing employment in Toledo had grown by 4.1% between December 2013 and December 2014 (this was double the rate than the United States average). More so, construction job growth grew by nearly 10% in the same time period. In 2014, manufacturing added 1,700 jobs to the Toledo area, but it also saw losses in the business services. In 2014, the US Census Estimated there were roughly 285,000 people employed in the Toledo metropolitan area. In August 2015, it was reported that Toledo's unemployment rate reached a 10-year low, and in June 2015 just 5% of the regional population was unemployed, whereas the United States average unemployment was at 5.3% during the same period.

Demographics

As of the census of 2010, there were 659,188 people, 259,973 households, and 169,384 families residing within the MSA. The racial makeup of the MSA was 83.03% White, 12.01% African American, 0.25% Native American, 1.07% Asian, 0.02% Pacific Islander, 1.79% from other races, and 1.83% from two or more races. Hispanic or Latino of any race were 4.35% of the population.

The median income for a household in the MSA was $42,686, and the median income for a family was $51,882. Males had a median income of $38,959 versus $25,738 for females. The per capita income for the MSA was $20,694.

All communities and townships in the Toledo MSA

Fulton County

Communities

 Archbold
 Delta
 Fayette
 Lyons
 Metamora
 Swanton
 Wauseon

Townships

 Amboy
 Chesterfield
 Clinton
 Dover
 Franklin
 Fulton
 German
 Gorham
 Pike
 Royalton
 Swan Creek
 York

Lucas County

Communities

 Berkey
 Harbor View
 Holland
 Maumee
 Oregon
 Ottawa Hills
 Sylvania
 Toledo
 Waterville
 Whitehouse

Townships

 Harding
 Jerusalem
 Monclova
 Providence
 Richfield
 Spencer
 Springfield
 Swanton
 Sylvania
 Washington
 Waterville

Ottawa County

Communities

 Clay Center
 Elmore
 Genoa
 Marblehead
 Oak Harbor
 Port Clinton
 Put-in-Bay
 Rocky Ridge

Townships

 Allen
 Bay
 Benton
 Carroll
 Catawba Island
 Clay
 Danbury
 Erie
 Harris
 Portage
 Put-in-Bay
 Salem

Wood County

Communities

 Bairdstown
 Bloomdale
 Bowling Green
 Bradner
 Custar
 Cygnet
 Grand Rapids
 Haskins
 Hoytville
 Jerry City
 Luckey
 Millbury
 Milton Center
 North Baltimore
 Northwood
 Pemberville
 Perrysburg
 Portage
 Risingsun
 Rossford
 Tontogany
 Walbridge
 Wayne
 West Millgrove
 Weston

Townships

 Bloom
 Center
 Freedom
 Grand Rapids
 Henry
 Jackson
 Lake
 Liberty
 Middleton
 Milton
 Montgomery
 Perry
 Perrysburg
 Plain
 Portage
 Troy
 Washington
 Webster
 Weston

References

External links
 Toledo Metropolitan Area Council of Governments